Nelson and Llancaiach railway station served the village of Nelson and the hamlet of Llancaiach in the historic county of Caerphilly, Wales, from 1912 to 1964 on the Rhymney Railway.

History 
The station opened on 1 July 1912 by the Rhymney Railway, replacing the adjacent Llancaiach station. It was situated on the north side of the neighbourhood of Tawelfan. It closed on 15 June 1964. The platforms still exist.

References

External links 

Former Rhymney Railway stations
Railway stations in Great Britain opened in 1912
Railway stations in Great Britain closed in 1964
1912 establishments in Wales
1964 disestablishments in Wales